Revere School District may refer to:
 Revere Local School District (Ohio)
 Revere Public Schools (Massachusetts)